The Plaza de Castilla is a roundabout in the north of Madrid, Spain.

Location 
It is located in the north of the city and is bisected by Paseo de la Castellana, one of the main thoroughfares of the capital, almost at its end. It lies between the districts of Chamartín and Tetuán. It is the quadripoint intersecting the neighborhoods of Castilla, Nueva España, Almenara and Castillejos. The Avenida de Asturias and the streets of Agustín de Foxá, Mateo Inurria and Bravo Murillo also converge in this place .

A major transport node of the city, the Plaza de Castilla is located on the grounds of what was formerly called "El Hotel del Negro".

The Puerta de Europa Towers are situated at the north end of the Plaza. Erected directly in the center of the roundabout, the maligned Caja Madrid Obelisk (best known as the Calatrava's Obelisk)  was inaugurated in 2009. A monument to José Calvo Sotelo lies on the southern end of the Plaza de Castilla.

References 

Castilla